Willem "Wim" Ruska (29 August 1940 – 14 February 2015) was a judoka from the Netherlands. He is the first athlete to win two gold medals in Judo in one Olympics – in the heavyweight and absolute categories in 1972.

Judo career
He started learning judo at the Dutch Navy, later traveling to Japan for further training. In the 1960s and 1970s, under the training of Jon Bluming, he won seven European titles, five in the +93 kg category (1966–67, 1969, 1971–72) and two in the open category (1969 and 1972). He furthermore won two world titles (1967 and 1971) and two Olympic titles. His success at the 1972 Summer Olympics was overshadowed by the Munich massacre that took place days before.

He retired after the 1972 Olympics and later took part in professional wrestling.

Professional wrestling career
Ruska competed between 1976 and 1980 for the New Japan Pro-Wrestling and World Wrestling Federation promotions. He had over 150 pro wrestling matches, in some of which he was the tag team partner of fellow judoka Allen Coage.

Match with Ivan Gomes
In 1976, during a tour through Brazil, Ruska was slated to fight a special, high-level bout against Ivan Gomes, a famous vale tudo fighter and former NJPW wrestler himself, on August 7 at the Maracanã Stadium. Previous negotiations about the match's results and length were troublesome, and as a result, there was tension between the parts.

During the bout, refereed by Mr. Takahashi, Gomes attacked Ruska with real strikes and illegal closed-fisted punches, which Ruska answered by landing a similar right punch, and the match became a shoot right after. The slightly heavier Brazilian dragged Ruska to the ground with a guillotine choke, but Ruska escaped and mounted him. After becoming entangled with the ring ropes, a bloody Gomes captured Ruska's back and tried a rear naked choke, to which Ruska grabbed the ropes to break action as per the match's rules. However, the Brazilian refused to release Ruska, so the referee, upon observing most of Gomes' body was outside the ropes, called for countout on him in order to end the match at 9:03. There was controversy about whether the choke and the rope escape were effective or not.

The event's crowds believed Gomes had been wronged with the decision, and a riot almost broke out until NJPW president Antonio Inoki came out and calmed them down. Still, repercussion in Brazil was negative, with pundits arguing about who should be considered the victor, even although some acknowledged Gomes had started the affair with an illegal move. As a consequence, the Athletic Commission of Rio de Janeiro banned Takahashi and Ruska from all sport competitions. The Japanese considered Ruska the winner, as Gomes had to receive nine stitches around the right eye for damage suffered in the brawl, while Ruska was comparatively in much better condition. It was also reported Inoki secretly gifted Ruska a money bonus to compensate his ban from competing.

A 90 seconds excerpt of the brawl was shown in 1995 in NJPW's TV show, World Pro Wrestling. During the show, Inoki compared the match to a mixed martial arts fight from Ultimate Fighting Championship.

Late career
Ruska was a close friend to sambo world champion Chris Dolman, also a Bluming understudy. They had a falling out after Dolman joined Akira Maeda's Fighting Network Rings while Ruska was part of Antonio Inoki's New Japan Pro-Wrestling, but they mended it in September 1997, when Inoki visited Holland along with Naoya Ogawa. They stayed in contact until Ruska's death in 2015.

Later life

In 2001 Ruska suffered a major stroke which left him physically disabled.

In 2013 he was inducted in the Hall of Fame of the International Judo Federation.

Ruska was admitted to a nursing home in 2014.  Ruska died on 14 February 2015 at the age of 74 and was survived by his wife, two children and five grandchildren.

Gallery

References

External links

 
 
 
 Wim Ruska Dutch homepage
 Videos of Wim Ruska on Judovision

1940 births
2015 deaths
Dutch male judoka
Dutch male professional wrestlers
Judoka at the 1972 Summer Olympics
Olympic gold medalists for the Netherlands
Olympic judoka of the Netherlands
Olympic medalists in judo
Sportspeople from Amsterdam
World judo champions
Medalists at the 1972 Summer Olympics
Expatriate professional wrestlers in Japan